Phractura macrura is a species of catfish in the genus Phractura. It is found in rivers in Angola. It has a length of 9.1 cm.

References 

macrura
Freshwater fish of Africa
Fish described in 1967
Taxa named by Max Poll